Pallel is a town in Kakching district of Manipur, India. It is the gateway to the Tran-Asian super Highway. It is situated in NH-39, 46 km southeast of the capital Imphal.

People 
BK Nehru, the first governor of Manipur, once said, "If you want to see all types of people of Manipur, go to Pallel gate."  Pallel is known for its wide range of people of different communities living together in harmony peacefully. The Lamkangs, the Marings, the Aimols, the Kukis, the Meiteis, etc. live together.

Education 
Being a business centre, the education system is not up to the mark. There are high schools but colleges are yet to be established. The nearest college is situated at Komlathabi, which is 5 km from Pallel. Some of the schools in Pallel are

 The Ideal High School, Molnoi
 MG Evergreen High Secondary School, Tuishimi
 VM High School, H. Wajang
 Pallel High School.
 The Trinity High School, Maringphai
 Cornerstone High School, Lhunnajang
 Amita Memorial children school
The Renaissance Academy

Business 
it is good place to start business either in the form of International or domestic.

References

Cities and towns in Kakching district